Chaos Control may refer to:
 Chaos Control (video game), a 1995 video game
 The ability possessed by certain characters in Sonic the Hedgehog
 Control of chaos, a technique used in chaos theory

See also
 KAOS and CONTROL, spy agencies from Get Smart